Newton Municipal Airport may refer to:

Newton Municipal Airport (Iowa), in Newton, Iowa, United States (FAA: TNU)
Newton Municipal Airport (Texas), in Newton, Texas, United States (FAA: 61R)